The 1984 Omloop Het Volk was the 39th edition of the Omloop Het Volk cycle race and was held on 3 March 1984. The race started and finished in Ghent. The race was won by Eddy Planckaert.

General classification

References

1984
Omloop Het Nieuwsblad
Omloop Het Nieuwsblad
March 1984 sports events in Europe
1984 Super Prestige Pernod International